Vardi may refer to:

People 
Emanuel Vardi (1915–2011), Israeli-born American violist and composer
Arie Vardi (born 1937), Israeli classical pianist
Moshe Vardi (born 1954), Israeli computer scientist
Yossi Vardi (born 1942), Israeli tech entrepreneur

Places
Vardi, Estonia, village in Pärsti Parish, Viljandi County, Estonia

Arts Entertainment and Media
Vardi (film), a 1989 Bollywood film